Ng'ethe Njoroge (born November 10, 1928) is a Kenyan journalist and a former diplomat.

Biography
Njoroge was born to a Kikuyu family in Kenya. His parents, Leah Magana and George Segeni Njoroge, were pioneer Christians who attended the Church of the Torch which had been founded by the famous Church of Scotland minister, John William Arthur. The news and entertainment site Tuko has alleged that the elder Njoroge was born an ethnic Masai but changed his name from Segeni ole Mbuchucha to the Kikuyu name Njoroge. The elder Njoroge worked as a cook at a Presbyterian mission in Nairobi and later opened a store and a transport company. Njoroge has five brothers and one sister. His sister, Jemimah Gecaga (1920–1979), was the first female member of parliament in Kenya and his brother was Kenyan Cabinet Minister and Member of Parliament Njoroge Mungai (1926–2014). His cousin, Jomo Kenyatta, was the first elected president in Kenya.

Njoroge attended Alliance High School in Kikuyu, Kenya and Busoga University in Iganga, Uganda before moving to the United States where he attended Central State College in Wilberforce, Ohio and then in 1960 he went to Boston University where he received a M.S. in journalism in 1961.

According to an interview with his son, American guitarist Tom Morello, Njoroge was involved in the Mau Mau Uprising for Kenyan independence (1952–1960). Morello claimed in the same interview that his anti-authoritarian viewpoints are inspired by the involvement of his father in the uprising.

Career 
After the ascension of his cousin, Jomo Kenyatta, to the presidency, Njoroge held a number of positions in his government. He was named assistant secretary, Ministry of Lands and Settlements (1963–1964); senior assistant secretary, Ministry of Foreign Affairs (1964); delegate to the Organisation of African Unity (1964); member of the Delegation to the Commonwealth Heads of Government Meeting (1964); member of the Kenyan Delegation to the United Nations General Assembly (1964, 1965, 1966); head of the Africa and Middle East Division of the Ministry of Foreign Affairs in Nairobi (1964–1967); counselor of the Kenyan Embassy in Bonn, Germany (1968–1970); Ambassador to Italy and Switzerland (1974); and Kenyan High Commissioner to the United Kingdom (1970–1978).

Personal life
Njoroge married teacher and activist  Mary Morello; they had one son, Rage Against the Machine guitarist Tom Morello. They were divorced a year after their son was born. When Morello was 16 months old, Njoroge denied he was his son and returned back to Kenya. He later remarried and had three more sons.

References

Kenyan diplomats
Permanent Representatives of Kenya to the United Nations
High Commissioners of Kenya to the United Kingdom
Kenyan rebels
Kenyatta family
Kikuyu people
Living people
Ambassadors of Kenya to Italy
Ambassadors of Kenya to Switzerland
Central State University alumni
Boston University alumni
1928 births